Life is a 1996 Australian film about life in a section of a prison reserved for those infected with HIV.

The film won the International Critics' Prize at the 1996 Toronto International Film Festival.

References

External links

Australian drama films
HIV/AIDS in film
1990s prison drama films
1990s English-language films
1990s Australian films